Ahmed Khalaf Ali was an Egyptian gymnast. He competed in eight events at the 1948 Summer Olympics.

References

External links
 

Year of birth missing
Possibly living people
Egyptian male artistic gymnasts
Olympic gymnasts of Egypt
Gymnasts at the 1948 Summer Olympics
Place of birth missing